Chaotianmen may refer to:

 Chaotianmen Bridge, Chongqing, China, a road bridge that connects Jiangbei District with Nan'an District, above the Yangtze River
 Chaotianmen funicular, Yuzhong District, Chongqing
 Chaotianmen Station, Chongqing, China, a subway station of the Chongqing Rail Transit Line 1